Tuam Golf Club is a parkland course located in Tuam, County Galway. Founded in 1904, it has been an affiliated member of the Golfing Union of Ireland since 1940.

History
The origins of golf in Tuam go back to the early 1900s when two local businessmen holidayed in the town of Harrogate in England.  There they became acquainted with the game, purchased clubs and balls and brought them back to Tuam. Initially located in the townland of Cloonascragh (on land owned by one of the two businessmen), Tuam Golf Club opened in 1904 with 60 members. In 1937 it relocated to the lands of the Kilgarriff family at Mayfield.

In 1948 Christy O'Connor Snr came to the club as a professional, and gave local golf lessons.

In the mid-1970s, the club moved to its current location at Barnacurragh, with the course designed by Eddie Hackett.

In 1991 a new clubhouse was constructed, with bar, restaurant, changing rooms and a pro-shop. Improvement works continued over the years with Christy O'Connor Jnr advising the club. Other development work undertaken between 2007 and 2009 was under the guidance of golf architect Ken Kearney.

Tuam Golf Club granted full membership to lady members in 1992.

Tuam Golf Club has hosted several championship events, including the Connacht GUI Club finals, and The Irish Open Boys Championship.

Course
The course is Par 72, measuring 6138 meters, with most fairways being tree lined, with water features on three holes. The feature hole is the Par 3 15th hole, which is played from an elevated tee, over water to a sloping green.

Club honours

 Junior Cup  - Connacht Winners : 1998
 Jimmy Bruen Shield  - Connacht Winners : 1985, 1988, 1991, 1994, 2007, 2018
 Pierce Purcell Shield  - Connacht Winners : 1979, 1995, 1996
 Connacht Shield  - Connacht Winners : 1956, 1986, 1996
 Cecil Ewing Shield  - Connacht Winners : 1983, 1995, 2015
 Jimmy Carroll Cup  - All-Ireland Winners : 2006
 JB Carr Tournament  - All-Ireland Winners : 2007
 Miele Ladies Interclub Fourball  - All-Ireland Finalist : 2014
 Mary McKenna Diamond Trophy  - Connacht Winners : 2016, 2017
 Kenny Cup  - Connacht Winners : 2015, 2017, 2018
 Under 16 Interclub Competition  - Connacht Winners : 2018

References

External links
Tuam Golf Club Official Club Website

Golf clubs and courses in the Republic of Ireland
Golf in Connacht
Sport in Tuam
Sports clubs in County Galway
Sports venues in County Galway
Sports venues completed in 1904
1904 establishments in Ireland